Kickboxer is an American action film franchise that totals seven films. The first installment revolves around a character named Kurt Sloane, played by Jean-Claude Van Damme. Due to opting out of Kickboxer 2 to do the film Double Impact, the second through fourth installments focus on the character David Sloane (played by Sasha Mitchell), younger brother to Van Damme's character from the original. Redemption: Kickboxer 5 (simply titled The Redemption in the opening title card) focuses on Matt Reeves (played by Mark Dacascos), a friend of the Sloan family. After a long hiatus, a sixth entry was eventually made as Kickboxer: Vengeance, which also serves as a reboot to the storyline, with Alain Moussi portraying Kurt Sloane and original actor Van Damme playing his trainer. The seventh entry, titled Kickboxer: Retaliation, serves as a direct sequel to Kickboxer: Vengeance.

Films

Cast and characters

American martial arts films
Kickboxer (film series)
Martial arts tournament films
Action film series